Fibramia is a genus of fishes in the family Apogonidae from the Indian Ocean. The first fossil record of this genus is Fibramia keralensis (only otoliths found) from the Burdigalian (Miocene) of southwestern India.

Species
The recognized species in this genus are:
 Fibramia amboinensis (Bleeker, 1853) (Amboina cardinalfish)
 Fibramia lateralis  (Valenciennes, 1832) (humpback cardinalfish)
 Fibramia thermalis (G. Cuvier, 1829) (half-barred cardinalfish)
 Fibramia keralensis Carolin, Bajpai, Maurya & Schwarzhans, 2022 (otolith-based fossil species)

References

Apogoninae
Marine fish genera
Taxa named by Thomas H. Fraser